Rapeseed (Brassica napus subsp. napus), also known as rape, or oilseed rape, is a bright-yellow flowering member of the family Brassicaceae (mustard or cabbage family), cultivated mainly for its oil-rich seed, which naturally contains appreciable amounts of erucic acid. The term canola denotes a group of rapeseed cultivars which were bred to have very low levels of erucic acid and are especially prized for use as human and animal food. Rapeseed is the third-largest source of vegetable oil and the second-largest source of protein meal in the world.

Description 

They are radial and consist of four petals in a typical cross-form, alternating with four sepals. They have indeterminate racemose flowering starting at the lowest bud and growing upward in the following days. The flowers have two lateral stamens with short filaments, and four median stamens with longer filaments whose anthers split away from the flower's center upon flowering.

The rapeseed pods are green and elongated siliquae during development that eventually ripen to brown. Each pod has two compartments separated by an inner central wall within which a row of seeds develops. They have a reticulate surface texture, and are black and hard at maturity.

Etymology and taxonomy 

The species Brassica napus belongs to the flowering plant family Brassicaceae. Rapeseed is a subspecies with the autonym B. napus subsp. napus. It encompasses winter and spring oilseed, vegetable and fodder rape. Siberian kale is a distinct leaf rape form variety (B. napus var. pabularia) which used to be common as a winter-annual vegetable. The second subspecies of B. napus is B. napus subsp. rapifera (also subsp. napobrassica; the rutabaga, swede, or yellow turnip).

B. napus is a digenomic amphidiploid that occurred due to the interspecific hybridization between B. oleracea and B. rapa. It is a self-compatible pollinating species like the other amphidiploid Brassica species.

Ecology 
In Northern Ireland, B. napus and B. rapa are recorded as escapes in roadside verges and waste ground.

Uses 

Rapeseed is grown for the production of edible vegetable oils, animal feed, and biodiesel. Rapeseed was the third-leading source of vegetable oil in the world in 2000, after soybean and palm oil. It is the world's second-leading source of protein meal after soybean.

Vegetable oil 

Rapeseed oil is one of the oldest known vegetable oils, but historically was used in limited quantities due to high levels of erucic acid, which is damaging to cardiac muscle of animals, and glucosinolates, which made it less nutritious in animal feed. Rapeseed oil can contain up to 54% erucic acid. Food-grade oil derived from rapeseed cultivars, known as canola oil or low-erucic-acid rapeseed oil (LEAR oil), has been generally recognized as safe by the United States Food and Drug Administration. Canola oil is limited by government regulation to a maximum of 2% erucic acid by weight in the US and 2% in the EU, with special regulations for infant food. These low levels of erucic acid are not believed to cause harm in human infants.

Animal feed 
Processing of rapeseed for oil production produces rapeseed meal as a byproduct. The byproduct is a high-protein animal feed, competitive with soybean. Rapeseed is an excellent silage crop (fermented and stored in air-tight conditions for later use as a winterfeed). The feed is employed mostly for cattle feeding, but is also used for pigs and poultry. However, the high levels of erucic acid and glucosinolates in natural rapeseed oil significantly lowers the nutritional value of rapeseed press cakes for animal feed. Rapeseed meal is mostly used as a soil fertilizer rather than for animal feed in China.

Biodiesel 
Rapeseed oil is used as diesel fuel, either as biodiesel, straight in heated fuel systems, or blended with petroleum distillates for powering motor vehicles. Biodiesel may be used in pure form in newer engines without engine damage and is frequently combined with fossil-fuel diesel in ratios varying from 2% to 20% biodiesel. Owing to the costs of growing, crushing, and refining rapeseed biodiesel, rapeseed-derived biodiesel from new oil costs more to produce than standard diesel fuel, so diesel fuels are commonly made from the used oil. Rapeseed oil is the preferred oil stock for biodiesel production in most of Europe, accounting for about 80% of the feedstock, partly because rapeseed produces more oil per unit of land area compared to other oil sources, such as soybeans, but primarily because canola oil has a significantly lower gel point than most other vegetable oils.

Because of the changes to the environment caused by climate change, a 2018 study predicted that rapeseed would become an unreliable source of oil for biofuels.

Other 
Rapeseed is also used as a cover crop in the US during the winter as it prevents soil erosion, produces large amounts of biomass, suppresses weeds and can improve soil tilth with its root system. Some cultivars of rapeseed are also used as annual forage and are ready for grazing livestock 80 to 90 days after planting.

Rapeseed has a high melliferous potential (produces substances that can be collected by insects) and is a main forage crop for honeybees. Monofloral rapeseed honey has a whitish or milky yellow color, peppery taste and, due to its fast crystallization time, a soft-solid texture. It crystallizes within 3 to 4 weeks and can ferment over time if stored improperly. The low fructose-to-glucose ratio in monofloral rapeseed honey causes it to quickly granulate in the honeycomb, forcing beekeepers to extract the honey within 24 hours of it being capped.

As a biolubricant, rapeseed has possible uses for bio-medical applications (e.g., lubricants for artificial joints) and the use of personal lubricant for sexual purposes. Biolubricant containing 70% or more canola/rapeseed oil has replaced petroleum-based chainsaw oil in Austria although it is typically more expensive.

Rapeseed has been researched as a means of containing radionuclides that contaminated the soil after the Chernobyl disaster as it has a rate of uptake up to three times more than other grains, and only about 3 to 6% of the radionuclides go into the oilseeds.

Rapeseed meal can be incorporated into the soil as a biofumigant. It suppresses such fungal crop pathogens as Rhizoctonia solani and Pratylenchus penetr.

Cultivation 

Crops from the genus Brassica, including rapeseed, were among the earliest plants to be widely cultivated by mankind as early as 10,000 years ago. Rapeseed was being cultivated in India as early as 4000 B.C. and it spread to China and Japan 2000 years ago.

Rapeseed oil is predominantly cultivated in its winter form in most of Europe and Asia due to the requirement of vernalization to start the process of flowering. It is sown in autumn and remains in a leaf rosette on the soil surface during the winter. The plant grows a long vertical stem in the next spring followed by lateral branch development. It generally flowers in late spring with the process of pod development and ripening occurring over a period of 6–8 weeks until midsummer.

In Europe, winter rapeseed is grown as an annual break crop in three to four-year rotations with cereals such as wheat and barley, and break crops such as peas and beans. This is done to reduce the possibility of pests and diseases being carried over from one crop to another. Winter rape is less susceptible to crop failure as it is more vigorous than the summer variety and can compensate for damage done by pests.

Spring rapeseed is cultivated in Canada, northern Europe and Australia as it is not winter-hardy and does not require vernalization. The crop is sown in spring with stem development happening immediately after germination.

Rapeseed can be cultivated on a wide variety of well-drained soils, prefers a pH between 5.5 and 8.3 and has a moderate tolerance of soil salinity. It is predominantly a wind-pollinated plant but shows significantly increased grain yields when bee-pollinated, almost double the final yield but the effect is cultivar dependent. It is currently grown with high levels of nitrogen-containing fertilisers, and the manufacture of these generates N2O. An estimated 3–5% of nitrogen provided as fertilizer for rapeseed is converted to N2O.

Rapeseed has a high demand for nutrients. Especially its sulphur demand is the highest among all arable crops. Since the decrease of atmospheric sulphur inputs during the 1980s sulphur fertilization has become a standard measure in oilseed rape production. Among the micronutrients rapeseed special attention in rapeseed cultivation has to be given to boron, manganese and molybdenum.

Climate change 

The cultivatable range for rapeseed is both expected to decrease due to climate change, and where rapeseed is grown quality of the crop, in both yield and volume of oil is expected to decrease substantially. Some researchers recommend finding alternative varieties of Brassica for cultivation.

Diseases and pests 
The main diseases of the winter rapeseed crop are canker, light leaf spot (Pyrenopeziza brassicae), alternaria- and sclerotinia- stem rots. Canker causes leaf spotting, and premature ripening and weakening of the stem during the autumn-winter (fall-winter) period. A conazole- or triazole- fungicide treatment is required in late autumn (fall) and in spring against canker while broad-spectrum fungicides are used during the spring-summer period for alternaria and sclerotinia control. Oilseed rape cannot be planted in close rotation with itself due to soil-borne diseases such as sclerotinia, verticillium wilt and clubroot.

Transexpression of a class II chitinase from barley (Hordeum vulgare) and a type I ribosome inactivating protein into B. juncea produces a large . Chhikara et al., 2012 finds that this combination of transgenes reduces hyphal growth by 44% and delays disease presentation in Alternaria brassicicola of juncea.

Pests 
Rapeseed is attacked by a wide variety of insects,  as well as wood pigeons. The brassica pod midge (Dasineura brassicae), cabbage seed weevil (Ceutorhynchus assimilis), cabbage stem weevil (Ceutorhynchus pallidactylus), cabbage stem flea beetle (Psylliodes chrysocephala), rape stem weevil (Ceutorhynchus napi) and pollen beetles are the primary insect pests that prey on the oilseed rape crop in Europe. The insect pests can feed on developing pods to lay eggs inside and eat the developing seeds, bore into the plant's stem and feed on pollen, leaves and flowers. Synthetic pyrethroid insecticides are the main attack vector against insect pests though there is a large-scale use of prophylactic insecticides in many countries. Molluscicide pellets are used either before or after sowing of the rapeseed crop to protect against slugs.

Genetics and breeding 
In 2014 an SNP array was released for B. napus by Dalton-Morgan et al., and another by Clarke et al., in 2016, both of which have since become widely used in molecular breeding. In a demonstration of the importance of epigenetics, Hauben et al., 2009 found that isogenic lines did not have identical energy use efficiencies in actual growing conditions, due to epigenetic differences. Specific locus amplified fragment sequencing (SLAF-seq) was applied to B. napus by Geng et al., in 2016, revealing the genetics of the past domestication process, providing data for genome-wide association studies (GWAS), and being used to construct a high-density linkage map.

History of the cultivars 
In 1973, Canadian agricultural scientists launched a marketing campaign to promote canola consumption. Seed, oil, and protein meal derived from rapeseed cultivars which are low in erucic acid and low in glucosinolates was originally registered as a trademark, in 1978, of the Canola Council of Canada, as "canola". Canola is now a generic term for edible varieties of rapeseed, but is still officially defined in Canada as rapeseed oil that "must contain less than 2% erucic acid and less than 30 µmol of glucosinolates per gram of air-dried oil-free meal."
In the 1980ies decreasing atmospherical sulphur inputs to Norher European soils in connection with a less efficient internal use of sulphur in the metabolism of the new bred low glucosinolate varieties (00-varieties) resulted in an increased appearance of white flowering, a highly spcifice symptom of sulphur deficiency, in rapeseed crops  which during the official variety assessment procedures was wrongly attributed to a genetic inhomogeneity ("Canadian blood").

The anticipated damages of wild animals caused by foraging on 00-oilseed rape crops was caused by a shift of the animals diet towards increased uptake protein and sulphur containing metabolites at the expense of fibers, but not to specific feaatures of the genetically alterated 00-varieties.

Following the European Parliament's Transport Biofuels Directive in 2003 promoting the use of biofuels, the cultivation of winter rapeseed increased dramatically in Europe.

Bayer Cropscience, in collaboration with BGI-Shenzhen, China, KeyGene, the Netherlands, and the University of Queensland, Australia, announced it had sequenced the entire genome of B. napus and its constituent genomes present in B. rapa and B. oleracea in 2009. The "A" genome component of the amphidiploid rapeseed species B. napus is currently being sequenced by the Multinational Brassica Genome Project.

A genetically modified variety of rapeseed was developed in 1998, engineered for glyphosate tolerance, and is considered to be the most disease- and drought-resistant canola. By 2009, 90% of the rapeseed crops planted in Canada were of this sort.

GMO cultivars 

The Monsanto company genetically engineered new cultivars of rapeseed to be resistant to the effects of its herbicide, Roundup. In 1998, they brought this to the Canadian market. Monsanto sought compensation from farmers found to have crops of this cultivar in their fields without paying a license fee. However, these farmers claimed that the pollen containing the Roundup Ready gene was blown into their fields and crossed with unaltered canola. Other farmers claimed that after spraying Roundup in non-canola fields to kill weeds before planting, Roundup Ready volunteers were left behind, causing extra expense to rid their fields of the weeds.

In a closely followed legal battle, the Supreme Court of Canada found in favor of Monsanto's patent infringement claim for unlicensed growing of Roundup Ready in its 2004 ruling on Monsanto Canada Inc. v. Schmeiser, but also ruled that Schmeiser was not required to pay any damages. The case garnered international controversy, as a court-sanctioned legitimization for the global patent protection of genetically modified crops. In March 2008, an out-of-court settlement between Monsanto and Schmeiser agreed that Monsanto would clean up the entire GMO-canola crop on Schmeiser's farm, at a cost of about CAN$660.

Production 

Worldwide production of rapeseed (including canola) has increased sixfold between 1975 and 2007. The production of canola and rapeseed since 1975 has opened up the edible oil market for rapeseed oil. Rapeseed oil is positioned to supply a good portion of the vegetable oils needed to produce that fuel. World production was thus expected to trend further upward between 2005 and 2015 as biodiesel content requirements in Europe go into effect.

See also 
 Triangle of U

Explanatory notes

References

Citations

General sources

External links 
 
 

Asian vegetables
Brassica
Crops
Edible nuts and seeds
Energy crops
Fodder
Leaf vegetables
Medicinal plants
Plants described in 1753